Craigia kwangsiensis is a species of flowering plant in the family Malvaceae sensu lato or Tiliaceae.
It is found only in China.

References

kwangsiensis
Endemic flora of China
Flora of Hubei
Critically endangered flora of Asia
Taxonomy articles created by Polbot